Rikshospitalet is a light rail tram stop at the end of the Ullevål Hageby Line of the Oslo Tramway. It is located at Rikshospitalet, the Norwegian National Hospital, at Gaustad in Oslo, Norway.

The station opened on 1 June, 1999 as part of the line extension when the hospital opened. The expansion was financed by Oslo Package 2. The station is served by lines 17 and 18, using SL95 low-floor trams. This allows step-free access from and to all stations until the city center. Trams operate each five minutes. The next station is Gaustadalléen. In the past, line 10 which ran from Rikshospitalet to Jar, used to operate here.

References

Oslo Tramway stations in Oslo
Railway stations opened in 1999
1999 establishments in Norway